Thomas Hare  (born 1952) is the William Sauter LaPorte '28 Professor in Regional Studies and the Chair of the Department of Comparative Literature at Princeton University.

Originally trained as a Japanologist and spending much of his career at Stanford University, Hare has broken new ground by applying post-structuralist analysis of semiotics and discourse of the body to ancient Egyptian language and culture in his book ReMembering Osiris: Number, Gender, and the Word in Ancient Egyptian Representational Systems (1999, Stanford), and, most recently, brought speech-act theory and performance studies to bear on Japanese Noh drama in his translation and commentary on Zeami's Performance Notes (2008, Columbia). He has also written on Kūkai and Kamo no Chōmei.

References

American Egyptologists
American Japanologists
Japanese–English translators
American translators
1952 births
Living people
Princeton University faculty
Stanford University faculty
Adolf Hitler